Horacio González Fontova (30 October 1946 – 20 April 2020) was an Argentine actor, singer-songwriter and comedian. He was born in Buenos Aires. He was known for his roles in The Plague (1992), Aballay (2011) and Underdogs (2013). He appeared in the Argentine historical television series Algo habrán hecho por la historia argentina.

Fontova died of cancer in Buenos Aires on 20 April 2020, aged 73.

References

External links
 Nota y entrevista en el Diario Página12 por Gloria Guerrero
 por Mauro Apicella
 Nota y entrevista en el diario La Nación
 Nota y entrevista en www.rock.com.ar

1946 births
2020 deaths
Argentine male film actors
Argentine male television actors
Argentine male voice actors
Argentine comedians
20th-century Argentine male singers
Argentine male singer-songwriters
Singers from Buenos Aires
Deaths from cancer in Argentina